Butte Valley is an unincorporated community and census-designated place (CDP) named for a former settlement in Butte County, California, United States. A post office operated at Butte Valley from 1861 to 1871, when it was re-located to Durham. Butte Valley sits at an elevation of 351 feet (107 m). The 2010 United States census reported Butte Valley's population is 899.

Demographics

At the 2010 census Butte Valley had a population of 899. The racial makeup of Butte Valley was 782 (87.0%) White, 0 (0.0%) African American, 19 (2.1%) Native American, 9 (1.0%) Asian, 1 (0.1%) Pacific Islander, 42 (4.7%) from other races, and 46 (5.1%) from two or more races. Hispanic or Latino of any race were 89 people (9.9%).

The census reported that 893 people (99.3% of the population) lived in households, no one lived in non-institutionalized group quarters and 6 (0.7%) were institutionalized.

There were 339 households, 101 (29.8%) had children under the age of 18 living in them, 209 (61.7%) were opposite-sex married couples living together, 28 (8.3%) had a female householder with no husband present, 20 (5.9%) had a male householder with no wife present.  There were 16 (4.7%) unmarried opposite-sex partnerships, and 5 (1.5%) same-sex married couples or partnerships. 55 households (16.2%) were one person and 18 (5.3%) had someone living alone who was 65 or older. The average household size was 2.63.  There were 257 families (75.8% of households); the average family size was 2.94.

The age distribution was 187 people (20.8%) under the age of 18, 82 people (9.1%) aged 18 to 24, 163 people (18.1%) aged 25 to 44, 347 people (38.6%) aged 45 to 64, and 120 people (13.3%) who were 65 or older.  The median age was 46.3 years. For every 100 females, there were 102.5 males.  For every 100 females age 18 and over, there were 102.3 males.

There were 371 housing units at an average density of 20.3 per square mile (7.8/km),of which 339 were occupied, 289 (85.3%) by the owners and 50 (14.7%) by renters.  The homeowner vacancy rate was 0.7%; the rental vacancy rate was 15.3%.  762 people (84.8% of the population) lived in owner-occupied housing units and 131 people (14.6%) lived in rental housing units.

References

Census-designated places in Butte County, California
Census-designated places in California
1861 establishments in California